Physcia stellaris is a species of lichen. It is pale grey, but darker in the centre, and lacks isidia, lobules, soredia and pruina. It tests negative with potassium hydroxide. In North America, it is known colloquially as the fringed rosette lichen.

It can grow as an epiphyte. In Greece, it has been reported from the trunk of Platanus trees.

References

Caliciales
Taxa named by Carl Linnaeus
Lichens described in 1753
Lichens of North America
Lichen species